Paraleucogobio notacanthus is a species of cyprinid fish endemic to China.  It is the only member of the genus Paraleucogobio.

References
 

Gobioninae
Monotypic fish genera
Cyprinid fish of Asia
Freshwater fish of China